Rajarajeshwari Nagar is a metro station on the Purple Line of the Namma Metro serving the residential locality of Rajarajeshwari Nagara which was named after Jnanalakshi Rajarajeshwari temple located in Rajarajeshwari Nagar. To the north is the Bangalore University and to the south is the suburb city of Kengeri along with Kengeri Metro Station. This was inaugurated on 29 August 2021 and was commenced to the public on 30 August 2021.

Station layout

Entry/Exits
There are 2 Entry/Exit points – A and B. Commuters can use either of the points for their travel.

 Entry/Exit point A: Towards Gopalan Arcade Mall side
 Entry/Exit point B: Towards Sports Authority of India side

See also 

 Bangalore
 List of Namma Metro stations
 Transport in Karnataka
 List of metro systems
 List of rapid transit systems in India
 Bangalore portal
 Trains portal
 Transport portal
 Engineering portal

References 


Namma Metro stations